George Town Aerodrome , also known as George Town Airport, is a minor airport serving George Town, Tasmania, Australia which is operated by George Town Airport Association.

See also
 List of airports in Tasmania
 Official website

References

Airports in Tasmania